"3AM (Pull Up)" is a song recorded by English singer-songwriter Charli XCX, written for her mixtape Number 1 Angel (2017). The song features Danish singer and songwriter MØ. The song received positive reviews from critics, with some considering it a highlight of the mixtape.

Composition 
"3AM (Pull Up)" has been described as a bubbly synth-pop, tropical house and dancehall song. According to Pitchfork, the song's lyrical content contains an entire emotional arc. Rolling Stone observed that the lyrics described a "the throes of a so-bad-it's-good relationship." The single also shows XCX resisting the guy she keeps "backsliding" to, and contemplating the feeling of being a "booty call."

Release 
"3AM (Pull Up)" was one of three songs (the others being "Lipgloss" and "Dreamer") that were shared preceding the release of Number 1 Angel.

Critical reception 
"3AM (Pull Up)" received positive reviews from music critics. Billboard called the song "an album highlight", giving praise to MØ's guest appearance on the song. NME called the song "hugely fun". Ahead of the release of her 2022 album Crash, Consequence of Sound ranked the song as Charli's sixth best song.

Chart performance 
Despite not being released as a single, it reached #9 on the New Zealand Heatseekers chart.

References

2017 songs
Songs written by Charli XCX
Charli XCX songs
Songs written by MØ
Tropical house songs
Synth-pop songs
Dancehall songs
Bubblegum pop songs
Songs written by A. G. Cook